Igor Vasilyevich Yermakov (born 14 June 1977) is a Russian professional football coach and a former player. He is an assistant coach with FC Salyut Belgorod.

Club career
He played 8 seasons in the Russian Football National League for 5 different clubs.

Honours
 Russian Second Division Zone Center best midfielder: 2004.

References

External links
 

1977 births
People from Belgorod
Living people
Russian footballers
Association football midfielders
FC Salyut Belgorod players
FC Fakel Voronezh players
FC Metallurg Lipetsk players
FC Yenisey Krasnoyarsk players
FC Baltika Kaliningrad players
FC Darida Minsk Raion players
Belarusian Premier League players
Russian expatriate footballers
Expatriate footballers in Belarus
Sportspeople from Belgorod Oblast